Xun may refer to any of several southern African Khoisan languages

 Ju/’hoan language
 Kxoe language